You and Me is the debut solo album by Irish singer-songwriter Shane Filan. It was released via Capitol Records on 1 November 2013 in Ireland. The album was preceded by the release of his debut single "Everything to Me" which peaked at number 14 on the UK Singles Chart on the week of release. The album's second single, "About You", co-written by long-term collaborators Steve Mac and Wayne Hector, was released on 1 November 2013. "Knee Deep in My Heart" was released as the third and final single on 29 November 2013. The song "Baby Let's Dance" was released as promotional single on 4 October 2013. The album reached No. 6 in the UK.

Background
Filan reportedly signed a record deal which would see him cut his first studio album in April of this year. Filan said of the deal; ""I am so excited to be joining London Records, Universal Music, and being back in the studio in London and Nashville recording new songs has been amazing. One of the things that pleases me the most about this record is that I've been given the opportunity to write my own songs. I'm so excited for people to hear them!" Filan later announced the release of his debut single "Everything to Me" on 5 July, stating "Working on solo material is something I had always dreamed of doing, and I'm incredibly happy with the results. 'Everything To Me' is a very personal song to me lyrically; it is such an upbeat and optimistic record, perfect for the summer. I can't wait for people to hear it!"

Recording
Filan said of the album; "I got off to a really good start. Everything to Me felt like beginners' luck, but I didn't know how good it was. Then the label were phoning, going "This is great!" I’d shown to myself I could do this and that took the pressure off. I was flying in those first two weeks and then suddenly I was in Nashville with really famous songwriters, partly thinking 'WOW!' but also 'Right, let's do this.'" The album features writing credits and production from the likes of Steve Mac, Wayne Hector, Nick Atkinson, David Sneddon#The Nexus, Paul Barry, Cass Lowe, Patrick Mascall, Kylie Sackley, Brandon Hood and Martin Terefe, who between them have produced for the likes of Gabrielle Aplin, Lana Del Rey, Enrique Iglesias, LeAnn Rimes, Faith Hill and Jason Mraz. Filan revealed that he took inspiration from the likes of The Lumineers, Train and Mumford & Sons when writing and recording the album.

Promotion
He had television and radio promo tour in United Kingdom like on 7 August 2014: 0800 Real Radio, Cardiff; 1030 Town and Broadcasting, Cardiff; 1330 BBC Radio Wales Cardiff; 1545 96.4 Wave Swansea; 1610 Swansea Sound. The Everything to Me single together with his other song "One of These Days" off the album were also featured in the soundtrack album of a British computer-animated comedy film Postman Pat: The Movie and released in UK radio stations afterwards. He later went on to his You and Me Tour in 2013 (for Everything to Me Southeast Asian EP), 2014 in Western Europe and East Asia.

Track listing

Charts and certifications

Weekly charts

Year-end charts

Certifications

Release history

References

2013 debut albums
Shane Filan albums
Capitol Records albums